Smythies is a surname. Notable people with the surname include:

Bertram Smythies (1912–1999), British forester and ornithologist
Charles Smythies (1844–1894), British colonial bishop
Evelyn Arthur Smythies (1885–1975), British-Indian forester and philatelist
Harriette Smythies (1813-1883), English novelist and poet
John Raymond Smythies (1922–2019), British neuropsychiatrist, neuroscientist and neurophilosopher
Yorick Smythies (1917–1980), librarian and pupil of philosopher Ludwig Wittgenstein 

See also
Jill Smythies Award for botanical artists